New York Review may refer to:

The New York Review of Books, a semi-monthly magazine
New York Review Books, publishing division of the magazine
The New York Review of Magazines
The New York Review of Science Fiction
New York Review (Catholic journal),  a bimonthly Catholic church publication from 1905 to 1908
New York Review (Hawks), an Episcopal church publication from 1837 to 1842